Tazy is a breed of sighthound hunting dog originating from Kazakhstan. Though it looks similar to the Saluki sighthound, it is a related but different dog breed.

History 
Tazys are used in Kazakhstan primarily for hunting and are considered one of the oldest dog breeds in the world. Tazys are not recognized by any major kennel clubs, including the American Kennel Club, United Kennel Club, Canadian Kennel Club, or the Fédération Cynologique Internationale. Presently, there are barely 300 purebred dogs and the Kazakhstan government is trying to prevent the dog from becoming extinct.

Appearance 

Tazys are medium-sized, deep-chested, and long-legged dogs, with short length hair on the body and longer hair on the tail and ears.

Temperament 

Tazys tend to be independent and aloof to strangers. The Tazy is known for their playfulness, endurance, and vigilance. Tazys can run long distances at speeds of 12-15 kilometers (7–9 miles) per hour.

See also
 Dogs portal
 List of dog breeds

References 

Sighthounds
Dog breeds originating in Kazakhstan
Rare dog breeds